USS Clover may refer to more than one ship in the U.S. Navy:

 , a tugboat commissioned 28 November 1863.
 , a lighthouse tender during World War I.

See also 
 , a Cactus (A)-class buoy tender operated by the United States Coast Guard between 1942 and 1990. 

United States Navy ship names